Fernando Rita (born 30 November 1961) is a Spanish sailor. He competed in the Star event at the 1992 Summer Olympics. In the Snipe class he was third at the World's in 1999, European champion in 1986, and third in 1988.

References

External links
 

1961 births
Living people
Spanish male sailors (sport)
Olympic sailors of Spain
Sailors at the 1992 Summer Olympics – Star
Sportspeople from Barcelona
Snipe class sailors